The International Indonesia Forum (IIF) is an organisation which holds annual interdisciplinary seminars in Indonesia in an attempt to "facilitate interactive engagement and participation of students and educators" both inside and outside of Indonesia. Originally developed as an offshoot of the Yale Indonesia Forum, it is now maintained independently. The seminar was first held in 2008 at Atma Jaya University, Yogyakarta; the eighth conference was held at Sebelas Maret University in Surakarta. The forum has published five books and hosts a working paper series on its website.

Overview
The International Indonesia Forum is run on a voluntary basis. It does not charge fees for presenters. Audience members may be from academia or the general public, including non-academic organisations. , five books have been published based on papers presented at the conferences. The chairman of the IIF is Frank Dhont. The forum hosts a working paper series on its website.

History
In 2003, Yale University in New Haven, Connecticut, established an interdisciplinary discussion forum for academics with a professional interest in Indonesia and related topics. This forum was established by three students, Frank Dhont, YoonSeok Lee, Thomas Pepinsky, with a member of the faculty, Indriyo Sukmono, as adviser. Initially meant for "members of the Yale community", this forum grew in size, until in 2006 it was capable of holding conferences. Discussions began in 2007 about having another conference, this time in Indonesia so as to facilitate the attendance of Indonesianists from outside the United States, particularly those in Indonesia. This second conference was hoped to "facilitate interactive engagement and participation of students and educators" from both Indonesia and abroad.

The first such conference was held at Atma Jaya University, Yogyakarta, in mid-2008: Atma Jaya handled financial issues related to hosting, whereas Yale handled the cost of publication. The conference, with the theme "Towards An Inclusive Democratic Indonesian Society: Bridging the Gap Between State Uniformity and Multicultural Identity Patterns", a theme which reviewer Alexander Claver described as "timely" owing to the issues of managing diversity and "societal heterogeneity and homogeneity". Claver wrote that the resulting book, though it did "not paint a coherent picture" and was uneven, was still "a rich source of ideas" and that most readers would find something of interest within.

The second forum, hosted at Sanata Dharma University (also in Yogyakarta), dealt with Pancasila, Indonesia's national ideology, and its role in the Reformation era. Claver writes that this was a development on the themes explored in the first conference. By this point half of attendees were Indonesian academics, with the remainder from various international institutions. An academic review of the conference's proceedings (published the following year) was highly negative: reviewer R. E. Elson wrote that the book was "disappointing", with "far too much airy and meaningless blather about identity and too much vacuous wordy and unproductive theorising" regarding its subject matter.

Various universities hosted the program in succeeding years, mostly in Yogyakarta but also in nearby Semarang. The number of participants increased yearly, and in 2011 the international conferences (increasingly separate from their parent organisation) were branched off under the title International Indonesia Forum. That year's conference, taking the theme of education for the future, was held at Yogyakarta State University and drew a crowd of 150 audience members and presenters.

In 2012 the conference, which received 171 submissions and saw nearly 100 speakers, was held at Gadjah Mada University in Yogyakarta; speakers originated from a number of international and Indonesian universities, including Harvard, Cornell, Berkeley, Sydney, Leiden, and the London School of Economics. The rector of Gadjah Mada University, Pratikno, stated that the conference was relevant to both Indonesia and the university as education was necessary to combat corruption. This was the last IIF conference with Yale support; a new, independent, organisational body was established so that the conference could continue independently.

The sixth conference was held at Sunan Kalijaga Islamic University, Yogyakarta, in 2013; over fifty individuals presented presenters. Of the conferences theme regarding change and continuity in the country, director of Sunan Kalijaga's post-graduate program Khoiruddin Nasution stated that changes were rapidly developing in the country and, as such, it was hoped that the IIF could provide recommendations to the Indonesian government regarding the correct path to take.

A seventh conference was held in 2014 at the Puri Khatulistiwa Hotel in Jatinangor, outside Bandung, in collaboration with the Sunan Gunung Djati State Islamic University Bandung. The two-day conference consisted of six sessions, with three panels in each session, and each panel consisting of four speakers. The sixty-four speakers came from such institutions as the University of Freiburg, Australian National University, and Charles Darwin University, and originated from countries such as Malaysia, Australia, and the United States. Topics discussed involved various aspects of Indonesian society, including law, history, culture, and economics. Ali Ramadhani, third vice president of Gunung Djati, stated that Indonesianists, such as those at the IIF, needed to stay confident in researching contemporary issues.

The eight IIF conference was hosted by Sebelas Maret University in the city of Surakarta between 29 and 30 July 2015. Seventy speakers, representing such universities as North Carolina, Berkeley, and London, attended the conference. Panel themes included Art and Tradition in Indonesia, Wayang: Traditional Puppetry in Modern Times, and Tradition and Economy. The following year, the ninth IIF conference was held at Atma Jaya Catholic University of Indonesia in Jakarta. More than fifty speakers presented papers with the theme "In Search of Key Drivers of Indonesian Empowerment". The keynote speaker,  of the Presidential Advisory Council, used the conference to call on Indonesianists and other academics to support the Indonesian government's efforts to promote empowerment.

Conferences

Publications

References

Works cited

External links

2008 establishments in Indonesia
Academic conferences
Indonesian studies